Antrechinus is a genus of echinoderms belonging to the family Urechinidae.

The species of this genus are found in the coasts of Antarctica.

Species:

Antrechinus drygalskii 
Antrechinus mortenseni 
Antrechinus nordenskjoldi

References

Urechinidae
Echinoidea genera